On 5 September 2013, a huge pile-up occurred on the southbound carriageway of the Sheppey Crossing, which at the time was a covered in heavy fog. In total, more than 130 vehicles were involved in a series of shunts and 35 people needed hospital treatment, with eight people sustaining serious injuries and 60 others sustaining minor injuries.

Crash 
On the morning of 5 September 2013, more than 130 vehicles were involved in a series of shunt crashes on the southbound carriageway of Sheppey Crossing, which at the time was covered in heavy fog. Emergency services were called to the crossing at around 7:15 a.m BST according to Kent Police, and the bridge was subsequently closed for nine hours. Firefighters had to free five people from their vehicles.

There were eight serious injuries and 60 minor injuries, but miraculously no deaths. South East Coast Ambulance Service (SECAMB) said that a further 200 people were either treated for minor injuries or given advice should symptoms develop later. The injured were taken to six different hospitals in Medway, Ashford, Margate, Maidstone, Canterbury and London, with Medway Maritime Hospital declaring a major incident to help deal with the incident.

Inappropriate driving in conditions of very poor visibility was suggested as the cause of the crash.

Aftermath 
Following the incident, questions were raised over the safety of the unlit bridge with calls for speed restrictions and overhead lights. The AA suggested matrix warning signs "as a minimum".

See also 
List of road accidents 2010–2019
1991 M4 motorway crash
1997 M42 motorway crash
2010 Keswick coach accident
M5 motorway crash
M40 minibus crash

References 

2010s in Kent
2010s road incidents in the United Kingdom
2013 disasters in the United Kingdom
2013 in England
2013 road incidents in Europe
Disasters in Kent
Road incidents in England
September 2013 events in the United Kingdom
Transport in Swale